David Riddoch (1864 – September 1926) was a Scottish professional footballer who played as a winger.

References

1864 births
1926 deaths
Footballers from Edinburgh
Scottish footballers
Association football wingers
Edina F.C. players
Heart of Midlothian F.C. players
St Bernard's F.C. players
Berwick Rangers F.C. players
Grimsby Town F.C. players
English Football League players